Harry Grenfell Archibald (September 21, 1910 – September 1965) was a Canadian politician, foreman and seaman. He was born in Wynot, Saskatchewan. He was elected to the House of Commons of Canada in 1945 as a member of the Co-operative Commonwealth Federation for the riding of Skeena.

A sympathiser of Trotskyism, Archibald was a covert member of the Revolutionary Workers' Party during part of his term in Parliament.
He was defeated in the elections of 1949 and 1953. Between 1943 and 1945, he served in the Royal Canadian Air Force as a Leading Aircraftman.

References

External links 
 
 Calgary, Alberta Crematorium Records, 1951-1979:A

1910 births
1965 deaths
Co-operative Commonwealth Federation MPs
20th-century Canadian legislators
Members of the House of Commons of Canada from British Columbia
People from Rural Municipality Emerald No. 277, Saskatchewan
Canadian Trotskyists